The Campbell Union School District is an American school district for Primary schools in the greater San Jose, California area. It was established in 1921. As of 2010, it served the communities of Campbell, Los Gatos, Monte Sereno, San Jose,  and Santa Clara. The district includes 13 schools (nine elementary schools, two middle schools, one TK-8 school, and one day school) for an enrollment of 7300 students.

Schools 
The district includes the following schools:

References

External links

School districts in Santa Clara County, California
1921 establishments in California
School districts established in 1921